Massisteria is a genus of Cercozoa. They are naked protists with a central cell body from which several delicately thin and stiff pseudopodia extend, each one bearing a small number of granules. Their pseudopodia remain adhered to the substrate, as is typical among leucodictyids. The cell body has two flagella that, during feeding, are held in place.

Taxonomy
The genus has two described species:
Massisteria marina 
Massisteria voersi

References

Sarcomonadea
Cercozoa genera